Holbæk Stadium (Danish: Holbæk Stadion) is a multi-use stadium in Holbæk, Denmark. It is currently used mostly for football matches and is the home stadium of Holbæk B&I and Nordvest FC.  The stadium holds 10,500 people.

External links
Entry at Stadions.dk

Football venues in Denmark
Holbæk